Lisa Seidman (born April 27, 1957, in Massapequa, New York) is an American television writer who has primarily written for soap operas. She is a graduate of Franklin & Marshall College. Seidman has written episodes for several prime time television drama series, which include CBS-TV's Dallas, for which she wrote thirteen episodes, Falcon Crest and Knots Landing, for which she wrote 7 each, Murder, She Wrote, Cagney & Lacey, and Scarecrow and Mrs. King.
 
She also has been nominated numerous times for awards for her screenwriting work on daytime television, twice winning in both 2012 for her work on the NBC-TV soap series Days of Our Lives and in 2014 for her work on The Young and the Restless.

Selected filmography
Cagney & Lacey: Writer (1984)
Dallas: Writer/Executive Story Consultant (1990–1991)
Dangerous Curves: Writer (1992)
Days of Our Lives: Script Writer (January 10, 2003 – February 21, 2003); Associate Head Writer (December 9, 2008 – August 31, 2011); Breakdown writer (August 19, 2015 – September 2, 2016)
Falcon Crest Writer/Story Editor (1987–1988)
General Hospital: Script Writer (January 14, 2020 – present)
Guiding Light: Script Writer (2002–2003)
Knots Landing: Head Writer  (January 1992 – May 13, 1993)
Knots Landing: Back To The Cul-De-Sac Co-Writer (1997)
Murder, She Wrote: Writer (1994)
One Life to Live: Script Writer (September 27, 2006 – May 18, 2007)
Scarecrow and Mrs. King: Writer (1985)
Silk Stalkings: Writer (1996)
Sunset Beach: Breakdown Writer (1999 – December 31, 1999); Script Writer (January 6, 1997 – 1998)
The Young and the Restless: Breakdown Writer (October 18, 2012 – November 9, 2012, January 26, 2017 – January 18, 2018); Writer (July 7, 2008 – October 2008), Associate Head Writer (November 12, 2012 – December 16, 2014)

Awards and nominations
Daytime Emmy Awards
2014 – Won - Daytime Emmy Outstanding Writing for a Drama Series, for The Young and the Restless
2012 – Won - Outstanding Drama Series Writing Team, for Days of Our Lives
2003 – Nominated - Best Writing; for Guiding Light)
Writers Guild of America Award
2002 – Nominated - Daytime Serials, for Guiding Light 
1997 – Won – Daytime Serials, for Sunset Beach
1998 – Nominated - (TV) Daytime Serials for Sunset Beach
2003 – Nominated - (TV) Daytime Serials for Guiding Light
2014 – Nominated -' (TV) Daytime Serials for The Young and The Restless''

References

American soap opera writers
1957 births
Franklin & Marshall College alumni
Writers from New York City
People from Massapequa, New York
Living people
Screenwriters from New York (state)